Cimitra seclusella is a moth of the family Tineidae first described by Francis Walker in 1864. It is found in India, Sri Lanka, Taiwan, Myanmar, Vietnam, Malaysia and Java.

Adult wingspan is 21 mm. Head, thorax and abdomen grayish brown. Semi erect scales found on the top of the head and on the face. Forewings rough scaled with four-five erect scaled ill-defined tufts. Frenulum single short and a stumpy bristle.

References

Moths of Asia
Moths described in 1864
Tineidae
Hapsiferinae